Altar is a Romanian metal band from Cluj Napoca, that formed in 1991. After a couple of local shows, the band had their first national concert at the '91 Samrock Festival, where they won the prize for the most popular band. After the performance at the Timișoara '92 Studfest, Altar was considered the revelation of the festival.In 1995, the band released the Respect album and participated in the SkipRock '95 festival, winning the "Best Band" and "Best Rock Album" nominations of the year in Romania. They enjoyed enormous success afterwards, releasing six albums and becoming one of the most important rock metal bands in Romania.

Band members

 Andy Ghost – Vocals
 Teo Peter – Bass [founder]
 Damian – Guitars 
 Allen – Drums

Discography
 1993: The Last Warning
 1995: Respect
 1998: Born Again
 2006: Atitudine
 2011: Mantra
 2022:  Rapsodia Românească

References

Altar Friends Facebook site
Altar Facebook Page
Interview With D-Man @ Iced-Earth.Net

Romanian heavy metal musical groups
Musical quartets